Adiantum raddianum, the Delta maidenhair fern, is one of the most popular ferns to grow indoors. It is native to South America and its common name comes from its shiny, dark leafstalks that resemble human hair. In the wild, it is found on forest floors, rock crevices, river banks, coastal cliffs, and basalt banks along trails and streams. The genus name Adiantum comes from the Greek word "adiantos", meaning "unwetted" (in reference to the leaves).

However it may be placed outside in a sheltered spot during the summer months. It requires high humidity, well-drained soil, bright indirect light, and a fairly constant temperature. It prefers neutral or slightly alkaline soil and is suitable for USDA hardiness zones 10 and 11. It can be susceptible to scale and mealybug. The cultivars ‘Brilliantelse’ and ‘Kensington Gem’ have won the Royal Horticultural Society's Award of Garden Merit.

A. raddianum is sometimes considered invasive in Hawaii and French Polynesia.

Gallery

References

External links

raddianum
Plants described in 1836